The 1952 Lamar Tech Cardinals football team was an American football team that represented Lamar State College of Technology (now known as Lamar University) during the 1952 college football season as a member of the Lone Star Conference. In their second year under head coach Stan Lambert, the team compiled a 2–7 record.

Schedule

References

Lamar
Lamar Cardinals football seasons
Lamar Tech Cardinals football